Fabien Roussel (born 16 April 1969) is a French politician who has served as national secretary of the French Communist Party (PCF) since 2018. He was elected to represent the 20th constituency of the Nord department in the National Assembly in 2017. Roussel was a candidate in the 2022 presidential election in which he placed eighth in the first round.

Early life
From a family of activists, Fabien Roussel is the son of Daniel Roussel, former journalist at L'Humanité. After he finished high school in Champigny-sur-Marne, in the Paris region, he graduated from the Journalists Development Centre (CPJ). He began his career as an image reporter at the Ardennes regional branch of television channel France 3. One of his paternal great-grandfathers was a Spanish refugee who died after being interned in the Vernet camp.

Early political career
During his high school years, Fabien Roussel engaged in the Mouvement Jeunes Communistes de France (MJCF) to denounce the apartheid in South Africa and demanded the release of Nelson Mandela. He also participated in major demonstrations against the Monory law and Devaquet bill, related respectively to employee shareholding and university organisation.

From 1997, he was advisor in charge of communication for Communist Michelle Demessine, then Secretary of State for Tourism under Prime Minister Lionel Jospin. He then worked for Jean-Jacques Candelier and Alain Bocquet.

Political career
In 2017, Roussel was elected to succeed Bocquet as the Member of Parliament for the 20th constituency of Nord as a member of the French Communist Party. He became party leader in 2018.

On 9 May 2021, Roussel won the Communist nomination for the 2022 presidential election.

Political positions
Roussel takes progressive positions on socioeconomic issues and favours raising the minimum wage to 1,500 euros a month post-tax, as well as reducing the workweek to 32 hours and lowering the retirement age to 60. Unlike many French leftists, he is strongly supportive of nuclear power and has expressed a positive view of hunting. He has expressed support for the 2023 pension reform strikes.

Personal life
Roussel lives with his partner Dorothée, a civil servant of category C.

See also
 General Secretary of the Communist Party

References

External links

 Campaign website 

1969 births
Living people
French people of Spanish descent
20th-century French journalists
21st-century French politicians
Deputies of the 15th National Assembly of the French Fifth Republic
French Communist Party politicians
French male journalists
People from Béthune
Politicians from Hauts-de-France
Candidates in the 2022 French presidential election